Archipimima is a genus of moths belonging to the family Tortricidae.

Species
Archipimima archipiforma Razowski & Pelz, 2004
Archipimima concavata (Meyrick, 1930)
Archipimima consentanea Razowski, 2004
Archipimima cosmoscelis (Meyrick, 1932)
Archipimima flexicostalis (Dognin, 1908)
Archipimima labyrinthopa (Meyrick, 1932)
Archipimima sinuocostana Razowski & Wojtusiak, 2006
Archipimima telemaco Razowski & Becker, 2011
Archipimima tylonota (Meyrick, 1926)
Archipimima vermelhana Razowski, 2004
Archipimima yanachagae Razowski & Wojtusiak, 2010

See also
List of Tortricidae genera

References

 , 2005: World Catalogue of Insects volume 5 Tortricidae.
 , 1986, Pan-Pacif. Ent. 62: 384
 , 2004: Atteriini collected in Brazil, with descriptions of four new species (Lepidoptera: Tortricidae). SHILAP Revista de Lepidopterología 32 (128): 347–353. Full article: .
 , 2011: Systematic and faunistic data on Neotropical Tortricidae: Phricanthini, Tortricini, Atteriini, Polyorthini, Chlidanotini (Lepidoptera: Tortricidae). SHILAP Revista de Lepidopterología 39 (154): 161–181.
 , 2010: Tortricidae (Lepidoptera) from Peru. Acta Zoologica Cracoviensia 53B (1-2): 73-159. . Full article:  .

External links
Tortricid.net

Atteriini
Tortricidae genera